The Midou or Midour (/midu/) is the left precursor of the Midouze, in the Southwest of France.

Geography 
The Midou rises in Armagnac, in the Gers département. It joins the Douze in Mont-de-Marsan to constitute the Midouze, a tributary of the Adour. It is considered the upper course of the Midouze by Sandre.

Départements and towns 

 Gers: by Nogaro
 Landes: Villeneuve-de-Marsan, Mont-de-Marsan

Main tributaries 
 (R) Riberette or Midour de Devant.
 (R) Midouzon,
 (L) Izaute, from Termes-d'Armagnac,
 (R) Jurane,
 (R) Estang.
 (L) Ludon, from Le Houga.
N.B. : (R) = right tributary; (L) = left tributary

Notes 

Rivers of France
Rivers of Gers
Rivers of Landes (department)
Rivers of Nouvelle-Aquitaine
Rivers of Occitania (administrative region)